Colquitt is a city in Miller County, in the southwestern portion of the U.S. state of Georgia. The population was 2,001 at the 2020 census. Colquitt is the county seat of Miller County, a role it has held since just after Miller County was created by the Georgia Legislature in 1856. The city formally incorporated on December 19, 1860, and is Miller County's only incorporated municipality.  Colquitt is named for U.S. Congressman and Senator Walter Terry Colquitt.

The Colquitt Town Square Historic District was added to the National Register of Historic Places in 1983.

Geography
Colquitt is located in the center of Miller County at  (31.173090, -84.728512). 

The city is located along U.S. Route 27, Georgia State Route 45, and Georgia State Route 91 in southwestern Georgia. U.S. 27 runs northwest-southeast through the center of town as Crawford Street, leading northwest  to Blakely and southeast  to Bainbridge. GA-45 runs north-south through the city concurrent with U.S. 27 and GA-91, and leads north  to Damascus and southwest  to Iron City. GA-91 also runs north-south through the city as well, and leads northeast  to Newton and southwest  to Donalsonville.

Culture and Arts

There are two Colquitt Theatres in the city:

The Cotton Hall Theatre is located in a former cotton warehouse at 158 East Main Street. It is home to Swamp Gravy, the "Official Folk Life Play of Georgia". The show is produced by the Colquitt-Miller Arts Council, using upwards of sixty volunteer actors and a professional production crew.
Hunter Theatre, formerly the Colquitt Theatre, is located on North 1st Street in the Hunter Building. It has undergone a renovation in recent years.
 
In December 2003, the musical play A Southern Christmas Carol, by award-winning playwright Rob Lauer, made its world premiere at Colquitt's Cotton Hall Theatre. Featuring a New York City-based cast of professional actors, the show was a critical and box-office success. The show was presented at Cotton Hall again in 2004 and 2005—attracting holiday season tourists to Colquitt from throughout the southeastern U.S. 'A Southern Christmas Carol has, in the years since, become an increasing popular holiday season show that is produced by theatres throughout the southeastern United States.

Colquitt was named Georgia's First Mural City by the state legislature, and hosted the Global Mural Conference in 2010.

Colquitt is a stop on the Trail of the Whispering Giants.

Demographics

2020 census

As of the 2020 United States census, there were 2,001 people, 854 households, and 520 families residing in the city.

2010 census
As of the 2010 United States Census, there were 1,992 people living in the city. The racial makeup of the city was 50.4% White, 45.9% Black, 0.2% Native American, 1.0% Asian and 0.7% from two or more races. 2.0% were Hispanic or Latino of any race.

2000 census
As of the census of 2000, there were 1,939 people, 772 households, and 501 families living in the city. The racial makeup of the city was 55.65% White, 43.63% African American, 0.26% Native American, 0.05% Asian, 0.05% from other races, and 0.36% from two or more races. Hispanic or Latino of any race were 0.31% of the population.

There were 772 households, out of which 28.5% had children under the age of 18 living with them, 37.4% were married couples living together, 22.2% had a female householder with no husband present, and 35.0% were non-families. 32.0% of all households were made up of individuals, and 18.5% had someone living alone who was 65 years of age or older.  The average household size was 2.34 and the average family size was 2.92.
 
In the city, the population was spread out, with 24.3% under the age of 18, 6.8% from 18 to 24, 23.6% from 25 to 44, 20.7% from 45 to 64, and 24.6% who were 65 years of age or older.  The median age was 41 years. For every 100 females, there were 78.9 males.  For every 100 females age 18 and over, there were 69.8 males.

The median income for a household in the city was $24,792, and the median income for a family was $31,413. About 21.3% of families and 26.0% of the population were below the poverty line, including 36.0% of those under age 18 and 25.5% of those age 65 or over.

Education

Colquitt is part of the Miller County School District.School Stats, Retrieved June 24, 2010. It is served by:

Miller County Elementary School
Miller County Middle School
Miller County High School

 Public Library 

Colquitt is home to the Miller County - James W. Merritt, Jr. Memorial Library. The library serves the citizens of Miller County with a collection of print and audiovisual materials. The library is located at 259 E. Main Street in Colquitt. 

Notable people
Peter Zack Geer, Lieutenant Governor of Georgia from 1963–1967
Charles Grant, NFL football player
Brandon Miller, National Football League player with the Atlanta Falcons and Seattle Seahawks
Keyon Nash, professional football player with the Oakland Raiders, as well as the Rhein Fire of NFL Europe, and the Canadian Football League's Toronto Argonauts
Gordie Richardson, Major League Baseball player with the St. Louis Cardinals and New York Mets
Zula Brown Toole, first woman to found a newspaper in Georgia, the Miller County Liberal'' in 1897

Gallery

References

External links

Colquitt- Miller County Chamber of Commerce 

Cities in Georgia (U.S. state)
Cities in Miller County, Georgia
County seats in Georgia (U.S. state)